CSDR is an initialism that may refer to;

California School for the Deaf, Riverside, a school in Riverside, California, United States of America. 
Center for the Study of Dispute Resolution, a research center under the University of Missouri School of Law.
Confederaţia Sindicatelor Democratice din România, the Democratic Trade Union Confederation of Romania
Central securities depository Regulation (No. 909/2014) of the European Union